Breaking and Entering: Music from the Film is the soundtrack album for the film Breaking and Entering and was released by V2 Records on November 6, 2006, almost two months before the film's theatrical release in the U.S.  The musical score is the result of a collaboration between Underworld and Gabriel Yared.

Track listing
 "A Thing Happens"
 "St Pancras"
 "Sad Amira"
 "Monkey One"
 "Not Talking"
 "Hungerford Bridge"
 "We Love Bea"
 "Happy Toast"
 "Monkey Two"
 "Will and Amira"
 "Primrose Hill"
 "So-ree"
 "Mending Things"
 "Broken Entered"
 "Piano Modal"
 "Counterpoint Hang Pulse"
 "JAL to Tokyo: Riverrun Version" (Japan Bonus Track)

Sigur Rós song "Sé lest" is heard during the credits, however the song does not appear on the soundtrack.

References

External links 
 Breaking and Entering review by Rafael Ruiz, December 22, 2006
 Gabriel Yared Official site
 Underworld Official site

Gabriel Yared albums
Underworld (band) albums
2006 soundtrack albums
V2 Records soundtracks
Drama film soundtracks
Romance film soundtracks
Crime film soundtracks